The 1968 kidnapping of Barbara Jane Mackle was the subject of an autobiographical book which was the basis of two television movies.

Background
Barbara Jane Mackle, aged 20 at the time of her kidnapping, was the daughter of Robert Mackle, a wealthy Florida land developer. Barbara was attending Emory University in Atlanta, Georgia, when the Hong Kong flu pandemic impacted the campus, resulting in Barbara contracting the illness. Barbara's mother travelled to Atlanta to take care of her daughter and drive her back to the family home in Coral Gables, Florida, for the Christmas break. Along the way they stayed at a Rodeway Inn in Decatur.

Events
On December 17, 1968, prison escapee Gary Steven Krist and his accomplice, Ruth Eisemann-Schierboth disguised as police officersknocked on the door of the room Barbara and her mother were sharing at the Rodeway Inn. Krist told Barbara that an acquaintance, Stewart Hunt Woodward, had been in a traffic accident. Once inside, Krist and Eisemann-Schier chloroformed, bound and gagged Mackle's mother and forced Barbara at gunpoint into the back of their waiting car, informing her that she was being kidnapped. They drove Barbara to a remote pine stand off South Berkeley Lake Road in Gwinnett County near Duluth and buried her in a shallow trench inside a fiberglass-reinforced box. The box was outfitted with an air pump, a battery-powered lamp, water laced with sedatives and food. Two plastic pipes provided Mackle with outside air.

Krist and Eisemann-Schier demanded a $500,000 ransom ($4.28 million in 2023 dollars) from Mackle's father. The first attempt at a ransom drop was disrupted when two policemen drove by. The kidnappers fled on foot, and the FBI found their car abandoned. Inside the car, the FBI found photographs of a man with a policeman's hat and the car registration in the name of George Deacon. 

The second ransom drop was successful, but there was no word from the kidnappers. The FBI was able to trace George Deacon to the University of Miami, where they realized he built ventilated boxes for a living. Deacon's boss provided the name of Ruth Eisemann-Schier, who also worked at the university, as someone Deacon spent time with. The FBI was contacted by a local man in Georgia claiming he had just bought a small trailer from a man and found some odd paperwork inside. The FBI discovered letters addressed to George Deacon and Gary Krist, an escapee from California prison since 1966, and when the FBI compared the prints found in the car to the ones found in Krist's file, they realized Deacon was actually Krist. On December 20, Krist called and gave a switchboard operator of the FBI vague directions to Mackle's burial place. The FBI set up their base in Lawrenceville, Gwinnett's county seat, and more than 100 agents spread out through the area in an attempt to find her, digging the ground with their hands and anything they could find to use. Mackle was found and rescued, suffering from dehydration but otherwise unharmed. She had spent more than three days buried underground.

Mackle was asked how she had remained so positive not only during the kidnapping but after, when she showed no ill effects from the ordeal. She claimed she would imagine spending Christmas with her family and never doubted she would be rescued.

Arrests and convictions of the perpetrators
Krist was arrested after a tip led a search towards the swamps of Florida that began on December 20, 1968, and went on through half the night,  hiding in a Florida swamp. Eisemann-Schier, who became the first woman to be listed on the FBI's ten most wanted list, was arrested March 5, 1969 in Norman, Oklahoma. She had applied for a job at a hospital and as part of the background check a fingerprint match was found by the Oklahoma State Bureau of Investigation. Eisemann-Schier claimed she left Miami because she and Krist became separated after the money drop and she was unable to get back to the car and thought Krist had abandoned her. She was convicted and sentenced to seven years in prison, paroled after serving four years, and deported to her native Honduras.

Krist was convicted and sentenced to life in prison in 1969, but was released on parole after ten years. Krist received a pardon to allow him to attend medical school. He practiced medicine in Indiana before his license was revoked in 2003 for lying about a disciplinary action received during his residency.

He was sentenced to five years and five months in prison and released in November 2010.

On August 27, 2012, in Mobile, Alabama, U.S. District Judge Callie Virginia Granade revoked Krist's supervised release for violation of his probation. He had left the country without permission, sailing to Cuba and South America on his sailboat. Judge Granade sentenced Krist to 40 months' imprisonment.

Books and movies
Mackle wrote a book (with The Miami Herald reporter Gene Miller) about her experience: 83 Hours Till Dawn, published in 1971. ABC aired the story in 1972 as part of its ABC Movie of the Week showcase under the title The Longest Night. The book was made into a second television movie, 83 Hours 'Til Dawn, in 1990. Krist also wrote a book, Life: The Man Who Kidnapped Barbara Jane Mackle, published in 1972. The 1973 exploitation film The Candy Snatchers is loosely based on the Mackle kidnapping.

Television movies
The Longest Night (1972)
83 Hours 'Til Dawn (1990)
 TV Series: FBI: The Untold Stories "Buried Alive" (S1E13) (1991)
 TV Series: A Crime to Remember "Coffin for Christmas" (S5E4) (2018)

See also
 Kidnapping of Ursula Herrmann in Germany
 List of solved missing person cases
 Miller v. Universal City Studios, Inc.

References
Notes

Bibliography

"The Girl in the Box". Time. December 27, 1968.
"Making an Impact". Time. January 3, 1969.
Gary Krist: The Einstein of Crime By David Krajicek from Court TV Crime Library
Doctor's License Revoked WISH-TV, August 29, 2003. (includes a picture of Krist) retrieved September 12, 2006

1960s missing person cases
1968 crimes in the United States
1968 in Georgia (U.S. state)
Kidnappings in the United States
Missing person cases in Georgia (U.S. state)